Starfish Prime was a high-altitude nuclear test conducted by the United States, a joint effort of the Atomic Energy Commission (AEC) and the Defense Atomic Support Agency. It was launched from Johnston Atoll on July 9, 1962, and was the largest nuclear test conducted in outer space, and one of five conducted by the US in space.

The explosion was about 10° above the horizon as seen from Hawaii, at 11 pm Hawaii time.

Operation Fishbowl

The Starfish test was one of five high-altitude tests grouped together as Operation Fishbowl within the larger Operation Dominic, a series of tests in 1962 begun in response to the Soviet announcement on August 30, 1961, that they would end a three-year moratorium on testing.

In 1958, the United States had completed six high-altitude nuclear tests that produced many unexpected results and raised many new questions. According to the U.S. Government Project Officer's Interim Report on the Starfish Prime project:
Previous high-altitude nuclear tests: YUCCA, TEAK, and ORANGE, plus the three ARGUS shots were poorly instrumented and hastily executed. Despite thorough studies of the meager data, present models of these bursts are sketchy and tentative. These models are too uncertain to permit extrapolation to other altitudes and yields with any confidence. Thus there is a strong need, not only for better instrumentation, but for further tests covering a range of altitudes and yields.

The Starfish test was originally planned as the second in the Fishbowl series, but the first launch (Bluegill) was lost by the radar tracking equipment and had to be destroyed in flight.

The initial Starfish launch attempt on June 20 was also aborted in flight, this time due to failure of the Thor launch vehicle. The Thor missile flew a normal trajectory for 59 seconds; then the rocket engine stopped, and the missile began to break apart. The range safety officer ordered the destruction of the missile and warhead. Parts of the missile and some radioactive contamination fell upon Johnston Atoll and nearby Sand Island and the surrounding ocean.

Explosion

The nuclear warhead detonated 13 minutes 41 seconds after liftoff of the Thor missile from Johnston Atoll.Starfish Prime caused an electromagnetic pulse (EMP) that was far larger than expected, so much larger that it drove much of the instrumentation off scale, causing great difficulty in getting accurate measurements. The EMP damage to the microwave link shut down telephone calls from Kauai to the other Hawaiian islands.

A total of 27 small rockets were launched from Johnston Atoll to obtain experimental data from the Starfish Prime detonation. In addition, a large number of rocket-borne instruments were launched from Barking Sands, Kauai, in the Hawaiian Islands.

A large number of United States military ships and aircraft were operating in support of Starfish Prime in the Johnston Atoll area and across the nearby North Pacific region.

A few military ships and aircraft were also positioned in the region of the South Pacific Ocean near the Samoan Islands. This location was at the southern end of the magnetic field line of the Earth's magnetic field from the position of the nuclear detonation, an area known as the "southern conjugate region" for the test. An uninvited scientific expeditionary ship from the Soviet Union was stationed near Johnston Atoll for the test, and another Soviet scientific expeditionary ship was in the southern conjugate region near the Samoan Islands.

After the Starfish Prime detonation, bright auroras were observed in the detonation area, as well as in the southern conjugate region on the other side of the equator from the detonation. According to one of the first technical reports:

These auroral effects were partially anticipated by Nicholas Christofilos, a scientist who had earlier worked on the Operation Argus high-altitude nuclear shots.

According to U.S. atomic veteran Cecil R. Coale, some hotels in Hawaii offered "rainbow bomb" parties on their roofs for Starfish Prime, contradicting some reports that the artificial aurora was unexpected.

"A 'Quick Look' at the Technical Results of Starfish Prime" (August 1962) states:

A 2006 report described the particle and field measurements of the Starfish diamagnetic cavity and the injected beta flux into the artificial radiation belt. These measurements describe the explosion from 0.1 milliseconds to 16 minutes after the detonation.

Aftereffects
While some of the energetic beta particles followed the Earth's magnetic field and illuminated the sky, other high-energy electrons became trapped and formed radiation belts around the Earth. There was much uncertainty and debate about the composition, magnitude and potential adverse effects from the trapped radiation after the detonation. The weaponeers became quite worried when three satellites in low Earth orbit were disabled. These included TRAAC and Transit 4B. The half-life of the energetic electrons was only a few days. At the time it was not known that solar and cosmic particle fluxes varied by a factor of 10, and energies could exceed . In the months that followed these man-made radiation belts eventually caused six or more satellites to fail, as radiation damaged their solar arrays or electronics, including the first commercial relay communication satellite, Telstar, as well as the United Kingdom's first satellite, Ariel 1. Detectors on Telstar, TRAAC, Injun, and Ariel 1 were used to measure distribution of the radiation produced by the tests.

In 1963, it was reported that Starfish Prime had created a belt of MeV electrons. In 1968, it was reported that some Starfish electrons had remained in the atmosphere for 5 years.

Resulting scientific discoveries
The Starfish bomb contained Cd-109 as a tracer, which helped work out the seasonal mixing rate of polar and tropical air masses.

See also

 List of artificial radiation belts
 List of nuclear weapons tests

References

External links

 – includes video of the explosion and audio of witness accounts.

Explosions in 1962
1962 in military history
July 1962 events
Johnston Atoll American nuclear explosive tests
Exoatmospheric nuclear weapons testing